The Seamen Milano are an American football team based in Milan, Italy that competes in the European League of Football. Prior to that, they competed in the Italian Football League.

History

80s
The Seamen Milano were founded by Sergio Galeotti, a shareholder of the "Giorgio Armani SpA" on October 27, 1981. In the 1980s they were one of the most successful Italian teams collecting two Italian Super Bowl appearances in 1987 and 1989, with an overall record of 68 wins, 4 draws and 39 defeats in 111 games played. After finishing the 1987 regular season with a record of 11–1, the Milano Seamen defeated the Giaguari Torino 49–3 in the eight-finals. Their winning streak continued after defeating the Rhinos 29-6 and the Doves 20–14 in the quarter- and semi-finals respectively. They lost the Super Bowl against the Frogs Legnano 24–27 after suffering a TD pass with a few seconds remaining on the game clock. They won the Under 20 National Championship in 1989. The team folded in 1990.

Re-foundation
After 19 years, in 2009, the team was reestablished by a group of former players, winning the Under 19 championship a year later in 2010 with a lot of athletes from the Falcons Milano, a team disbanded in 2009, the Seamen took part at the II Division championship.

In 2010, the Seamen Milano were admitted to the Italian Football League Championship. In 2012 Joe Avezzano became the Head Coach of the Milano Seamen. In 2014 the Seamen won the Italian Super Bowl for the first time in their history, beating the Parma Panthers 33–3. After the 2020 season was cancelled because of the covid pandemic, the Seamen were playing in the Italian Bowl four times in a row. They lost against the Parma Panthers with 34–40. In the 2021 CEFL season, they lost their quarter-finals too.

In the Italian Bowl 2022 they lost to the Guelfi Firenze with 17–21.

European League of Football
The team announced in April 2022, that they will join the for the 2023 season after negotiation talks with the national association were successful.

The organization will no longer participate in the IFL, but will have a cooperation with the local team Legano Frogs for developing young players. After that, the stadium, headcoach and general manager of the previous club were confirmed.

Current roster

Current staff

Season-by-season

Stadium
{
  "type": "FeatureCollection",
  "features": [
    {
      "type": "Feature",
      "properties": {},
      "geometry": {
        "type": "Point",
        "coordinates": [
          9.158151625015309,
          45.48143815697845
        ]
      }
    }
  ]
}
After the renovation of the historical stadium Velodromo Vigorelli ended up in 2018, the Milano Seamen were able to play again their home games there, after the brief experience at the Stadio Breda in Sesto San Giovanni, Milan. The Stadium features an artificial turf and endzones in the color of the franchise

Youth team
Seamen's Youth Sector, is one of the best of the country; in fact during the 2019–2020 season the Under 19 team reached the national final, in which they beat the Giaguari Torino 8–6. That game was played in Velodromo Vigorelli one of the best frames for American Football in Italy.

Honours
 Italian Bowl
 Champions: (5) 2014, 2015, 2017–2019

Notable player and coaches
 Dave Ritchie - Defensive coordinator 1989
 Joe Avezzano - Head coach 2011–2012
 Jonathan Dally - Quarterback 2014–2015
 Luke Zahradka - Quarterback 2017–present
 Giorgio Tavecchio - Kicker 2019
 Jordan Bouah - Wide receiver 2020–2021

References

Milano Seamen
1981 establishments in Italy
American football teams established in 1981
American football teams in Italy
Sport in Milan
European League of Football teams